Kissam is a surname. Notable people with the surname include:

William Kissam Vanderbilt (1849–1920), American heir, businessman, philanthropist and horsebreeder
William Kissam Vanderbilt II (1878–1944), American heir, motor racing enthusiast and yachtsman

Further reading